David Hume Pinsent (24 May 1891 – 8 May 1918) was a collaborator of the Austrian philosopher Ludwig Wittgenstein. Wittgenstein's Tractatus Logico-Philosophicus (1922) is dedicated to Pinsent's memory.

Early life

Pinsent, a descendant of philosopher David Hume's brother, John Home, was born in Edgbaston, Birmingham. He gained a first-class honours degree in mathematics at Cambridge University, where he was described by George Thomson, future master of Corpus Christi College as "the most brilliant man of my year, among the most brilliant I have ever met". Pinsent then studied law.

Career
He met Wittgenstein, two years older, as an undergraduate at Trinity College, Cambridge in 1912. He acted as Wittgenstein's subject in psychological experiments on rhythm in speech and music, and he struck up a rapport, based on shared interests in music and mathematics. That led to holidays together, including trips to Iceland and Norway, which Wittgenstein paid for. His diary (1912–1914) mentions his times and travels with Wittgenstein.

First World War
During the First World War, Pinsent was deemed unsuitable for active military service. He trained as a test pilot instead and worked at the Royal Aircraft Establishment in Farnborough, where he was killed in a flying accident in May 1918. His body was found in the Basingstoke Canal a week after the accident.

References

External links
 Sunningwell War Memorial — Brief biography of David Hume Pinsent
 Wittgenstein Chronology  - Chronology of Ludwig Wittgenstein's life, with summaries of Pinsent's diary entries for the times they spent together.

1891 births
1918 deaths
Alumni of Trinity College, Cambridge
People from Edgbaston
English test pilots
Ludwig Wittgenstein
Aviators killed in aviation accidents or incidents in England